The A 30 road is an A-Grade trunk road in Sri Lanka. It connects Vavuniya with Parayanalankulam.

The A 30 passes through Poovarasankulam and Pandisurichchan to reach Parayanalankulam.

References

Highways in Sri Lanka
Transport in Vavuniya District